Euchre  is a 19th-century trick-taking card game and has many variations.

Dealing variations

The addition of extra cards like 8 and 7 can usually add more uncertainty as for which trump cards are still in the opponent's hands during the course of the game. This uncertainty may be increased with the addition of the 2s.  

In some Euchre circles it is considered acceptable to "steal the deal" from the other team if they are not paying attention when it is their turn to deal.

McEvoy

If a player is dealt a hand consisting entirely of 9s and 10s, they may declare a 'McEvoy', resulting in a re-deal by the same dealer. The McEvoy must be declared, and the cards must be displayed immediately after the deal, before any player calls trump or passes. All players' cards are returned and re-dealt. Only one McEvoy is allowed per player per match.

Farmer's hand

Certain weak hands (usually those containing either three 10 cards or three 9 cards) are designated as "farmer's hands" or "bottoms." After inspecting the hand dealt, a player may call out "farmer's hand" (or simply "farmer's") and is then allowed to show the three cards in question and exchange them for the three unexposed cards in the kitty (also called "going under" or "under the table").

One variation allows that a player with any combination of a total of four 9 and/or 10 cards may call for a redeal . This is generally referred to as "farmer's hand mixed" while the prior example is called "farmer's hand clean." 

Another variation dictates that none of the low cards being exchanged may match the suit of the turned-up kitty card. If more than one player wishes to call farmer's hand, there is generally no structure for determining who will take the cards other than a first-come first-served method, although some players only call "farmers" on the player's turn to bid for trump. Otherwise, the person closest to the deal will sometimes be given priority. 

Some variations allow for multiple farmer's hands to be called out, but those exchanging cards with those left behind in the kitty after the first exchange are essentially guaranteed very poor cards.

A regional variation on the farmer's hand (Michigan) involves a player dealt three queens to trade for the cards in the kitty after declaring "bottom bitches".

Picking up the top card

Some areas require the dealer to discard first, and then pick up the card.
Others require the dealer to show the discarded card to all players.

Making trump

Chuck: A variation of Screw the Dealer. The dealer has the option to declare trump, keep one card from his dealt hand and exchange the other four for the cards in the kitty, including the card that was turned over. This can be a very strategic move, for example, the dealer can call Next when a Jack was turned over, guaranteeing at least having the left bower.
Club Euchre/Dirty Clubs:  Whenever the upturned kitty card is suited clubs, the dealer must "pick it up" and his team must play as the makers, with clubs as trump.
Wagering: If the top card from the kitty is turned down, the player to the left of the dealer may bid Euchre points to call trump, with a minimum of 2 points required to bid.  If the bidding player is Euchred, then their bid determines the number of points the opposing team will receive.  The player to the left of the bidder then has the option to raise the Euchre bid and call a different suit as trump.  This proceeds until the bid has returned to the initial bidder.  The initial bidder then has the final option to raise the bid or concede to the highest bidder.  The highest bidding player wins the trump call and play begins.
Poker for a Point:  A variation popular in Michigan, during the Making Trump phase any player may offer "Poker for a Point." If all players agree (or sometimes if only a player of the opposing team agrees), all hands are immediately shown and the team of the player whose five cards represent the best hand by Poker rules is awarded one point. The hand is then deadened and dealership continues to the next player.
Screw the Dealer / No Trump:  A variation of Screw the Dealer popular in Iowa, in which the Dealer has the option to declare "no trump" and hand is played with Aces high, no trump, and no bowers.
Aces High No Trump: Popular in Western NY and Wisconsin, after the first round of bidding, a player may place a bid of "No Trump," where Aces are the highest ranked cards and the strategy for the hand is based on keeping (or taking) the lead.
No suit: A variation in Ohio requires that after the first round of naming trump has passed (the original suit having been "turned down")and no trump having been called then a player may only call one of the three remaining suits trump if the player has at least one card of that suit in their hand. If all players pass again and no trump is chosen then the hand is redealt (or see above "Stick the Dealer" rule.)
No Trump High/No Trump Low:  A variation in Indiana and Ohio; if no suit has been named after two rounds of bidding, on the third round a player may call “No Trump High” or “No Trump Low.” In both these options, the jacks are valued between the ten and queen. In No Trump Low, nines are the winning cards, tens are second in value and so on.
The Mudge Gambler: If the trump selection comes all the way back around to the dealer the second time, the dealer may then call trump, take a single card from their hand, place it in the kitty and then use the kitty as their hand. The dealer calls trump knowing only two cards in the kitty hand (the one from their original hand and the up card). Winning all five tricks in this way is five points. Making three or four tricks is four.

Going alone

Partner's Best:  a maker "going alone", may choose to exchange a single card with his partner before trick taking begins.  The maker is required to discard before receiving his partner's card.
Canadian/Order Alone:  When the dealer's partner orders the dealer to "pick it up", the partner must attempt the hand as a loner.
Blind-Double Loner:  Before the maker sees his cards, the maker calls "blind double loner".  Here, the turn card is automatically trump, and the game is played by normal loner rules.  If the Blind-double Loner wins all 5 tricks, 8 points are awarded to the player's team.
Nello or Nullo:  When a maker "goes alone," attempting to lose every trick rather than to win every trick.  Playing the game with the possibility of nello changes the bidding strategy considerably.
Defending Alone: A player on the non-calling team may choose to defend alone, in which case a successful euchre is worth four points.

Throw-ins

These variations (often referred to as "House Rules" – reflecting their non-standard acceptability) allow a player dealt one of several types of poor hands to "throw in" their cards and initiate a redeal. In some circles, these are considered a form of "misdeal," causing the deal to be passed to the original dealer's left. In standard play, these are considered just part of normal play, and the player must play the hand they are dealt, regardless of how bad it might be; in the long run, things will even out.

Nines & Tens:  a hand consisting only of 9s and 10s.  It is impossible for more than one player to have such a hand in regular play.
Ace, No Face:  a single ace and nothing else except 9s and 10s containing only non-trump.
King Nothing:  a single king and nothing else except 9s and 10s containing only non-trump.
Bitches' Hand/Queens no Beans:  a single queen and nothing else except 9s and 10s containing only non-trump.
Jack Shit:  a single jack and nothing else except 9s and 10s containing only non-trump.
No Ace, No-Face, No Trump:  a throw-in hand determined after the make, containing only non-trump 9s and 10s.
Best Bower: Jokers are used as highest trump cards. "Big" Joker trumps "Little" Joker. Jokers are always highest trump cards.

Lay-down hand

A "lay-down hand" is similar to a throw-in, where a player may lay down his entire hand before a single card has been played. Rather than a poor hand, this is a perfect or unbeatable hand, and is scored as if it were played normally. The definition of a perfect hand will depend on the exact rules in use, but in most rules both bowers (jacks of the trump color) and 3 trump cards are needed, as in the perfect hand pictured at the top. However, some players might lay down a hand that is not strictly unbeatable under the assumption that nobody has the set of cards required to beat them. For instance, someone might lay down a hand that can only be beat on one trick (one bower, A, K, Q, 10 in trump suit). Since there is only one trick this player could lose (if someone has the other bower) they bypass playing the hand and simply ask if anyone has the other bower. Lay downs are an advanced skill reserved for veteran players to expedite game play, when everyone at the table can recognize that a hand is unbeatable.

Scoring variations and rituals

"Railroad Euchre" started in the UK as a way to speed up games for people playing on trains. Any points scored over the winning point are added to the next game. So if the winning team has 9 and scores 4 on a loner, they start the next game up by 3. 
Scoring can also be tracked with a two and a three. In this scenario the first five points are generally tracked by revealing the pips normally. Sometimes, both score cards face down in a V position (signifying Roman Numeral five) to signify five points. In either case, the sixth point and onward are marked by turning the bottom card sideways so that it forms a V, so that for six through nine the score is actually five plus the number of pips showing.
Some games are played to 11 points, rather than the typical 10.  The 5 and 6 are usually used as the score cards.
Games to 15, using the 7 and 8, are sometimes played as well when a longer game is desired.
In some areas of Western New York, if the person who "goes alone" is euchred (does not make at least 3 tricks), his team's score is decremented by 2 points (but not below zero) in addition to the other team scoring 2 points for the euchre.

See also
Euchre - standard Euchre
Euchre variants - other forms of Euchre
Bid Euchre - a variant form
Haus - a variant popular in upstate New York
Glossary of card game terms

References

External links 

Euchre group